Boulenophrys acuta is a species of frog in the family Megophryidae. It is endemic to China and only known from its type locality, Heishiding Nature Reserve in Fengkai County, Guangdong Province, southern China.

References

acuta
Frogs of China
Endemic fauna of China
Amphibians described in 2014